Parthenius I served as Greek Orthodox Patriarch of Alexandria between 1678 and 1688. Prior to being the Patriarch he served as Metropolitan of Nazareth. He suffered a serious injury in an earthquake in 1688 and died later that year in Smyrna, in Asia Minor.

References

17th-century Greek Patriarchs of Alexandria
17th-century Egyptian people
17th-century people from the Ottoman Empire